Paul Bartram Dague (May 19, 1898 – December 2, 1974) was a Republican member of the U.S. House of Representatives from Pennsylvania.

Biography
Paul Dague was born in Whitford, Pennsylvania.  He took special studies at West Chester State Teachers College and studied electrical engineering at Drexel Institute in Philadelphia, Pennsylvania. He was a member of the United States Marine Corps during World War I serving from 1918 to 1919.  He served as assistant superintendent of the Pennsylvania Department of Highways from 1925 to 1935.  He served as deputy sheriff of Chester County, Pennsylvania, 1936–1943, and sheriff of Chester County from 1944 to 1946.

He was elected in 1946 as a Republican to the 80th United States Congress and served until his resignation on December 30, 1966.  He was not a candidate for reelection to the 90th United States Congress in 1966. Dague voted in favor of the Civil Rights Acts of 1957, 1960, and 1964, as well as the 24th Amendment to the U.S. Constitution and the Voting Rights Act of 1965.

References

 Retrieved on 2008-01-13
The Political Graveyard

External links

1898 births
1974 deaths
United States Marine Corps personnel of World War I
Military personnel from Pennsylvania
Pennsylvania sheriffs
American Presbyterians
People from Downingtown, Pennsylvania
Republican Party members of the United States House of Representatives from Pennsylvania
20th-century American politicians